Dr. Nancy Ann Cynthia Francis is a former member of the Tamil Nadu Legislative Assembly. She was a non-elected, nominated member who represented the Anglo-Indian community. She is a medical doctor by profession and works at the Meenakshi Mission Hospital and Research Centre, Madurai. At the time of her first nomination, in 2011, she was also president of the All India Anglo-Indian Association. She was renominated in 2016 for a second term, despite criticism of her performance from some members of the Anglo-Indian community.

References

Living people
Tamil Nadu MLAs 2016–2021
Anglo-Indian people
Scientists from Madurai
Women scientists from Tamil Nadu
Indian anesthesiologists
Indian women medical doctors
20th-century Indian women scientists
20th-century Indian medical doctors
Medical doctors from Tamil Nadu
20th-century women physicians
Year of birth missing (living people)
Tamil Nadu MLAs 2011–2016
Tamil Nadu politicians
Women anesthesiologists